The Fédération Burkinabé du Scoutisme, the national federation of two Scouting organizations in Burkina Faso, was founded in 1943, and became a member of the World Organization of the Scout Movement in 1972 under the name of Upper Volta. The coeducational Fédération Burkinabé du Scoutisme has 9,398 members as of 2011.

The Scout Federation of Burkino Faso consists of Les Scouts du Burkina Faso and Les Éclaireurs et Éclaireuses du Burkina Faso.

Activities
Scouting pays particular attention to rural Scouting and community development in rural areas. Scouts participate in development projects run by the government by running large work camps planting trees, operating rural and urban centers and improving the water supplies.

Program sections
Pré-Louveteaux (Pre-Cubs) - younger than 7
Louvetaux (Cub Scouts) - ages 7 to 12
Éclaireurs (Scouts) - ages 12 to 17
Aînés (Rover Scouts) - ages 17 to 25

The Scout Motto is Prêt à servir, Ready to Serve in French.

See also
Association des Guides du Burkina Faso

References

Federation Burkinabe du Scoutism
Scouting and Guiding in Burkina Faso
Youth organizations established in 1943
1943 establishments in French West Africa